Krysle Lip is an American record producer, songwriter, and artist.

In 2018, was in charge of the transformation of the Hall of Mirrors, creating a permanent exhibition in the historical room inside Grevin Paris.

References

American record producers
21st-century American artists
American male songwriters
Year of birth missing (living people)
Living people